The 2017 BBC Sports Personality of the Year Award took place on 17 December 2017 at the Echo Arena in Liverpool. It was the 64th presentation of the BBC Sports Personality of the Year Award. Awarded annually by the British Broadcasting Corporation (BBC), the main award honours an individual's British sporting achievement over the past year, with the winner selected by public vote from a twelve-person shortlist.	

The event, broadcast live on BBC One, was hosted by Gary Lineker, Clare Balding and Gabby Logan.

Noel Gallagher's High Flying Birds opened the ceremony and later performed a cover of "All You Need Is Love" to celebrate camaraderie in sport during 2017. Rebecca Ferguson sang "Halo" in honour of Jessica Ennis-Hill and Rag'n'Bone Man performed Grace during the in memoriam.

Nominees
The nominees for the award were revealed by Gabby Logan on 27 November 2017, during BBC One's The One Show.

Controversy

Paradise Papers
In November 2017, Hamilton was named in the Paradise Papers. It was reported that Hamilton had avoided paying £3.3 million of Value Added Tax on his private jet worth £16.5 million. The leasing deal set up by advisers was said by the BBC to appear to be artificial and not to comply with an EU and UK ban on refunds for private use. Host of the BBC Sports Personality of the year Gary Lineker was also named in the Paradise Papers in November 2017.

Asthma medication
On 13 December 2017, the UCI announced that Froome had returned an "Adverse Analytical Finding" for twice his allowed dose of Salbutamol, a medication against asthma. Both the A and B samples proved positive. The test was taken after stage 18 of the Vuelta a España. In a statement, Froome commented: "My asthma got worse at the Vuelta so I followed the team doctor’s advice to increase my Salbutamol dosage. As always, I took the greatest care to ensure that I did not use more than the permissible dose." Froome later reiterated these comments during the ceremony.

The UCI officially closed the investigation on 2 July 2018, stating that Froome had supplied sufficient evidence to suggest that his "sample results do not constitute an AAF".

Other awards
In addition to the main award as "Sports Personality of the Year", several other awards will also be presented:

Overseas Personality: Roger Federer was announced as the winner for the fourth time 
Team of the Year: England Women's Cricket Team
Lifetime Achievement: Jessica Ennis-Hill
Coach of the Year: Benke Blomkvist, Stephen Maguire and Christian Malcolm
Helen Rollason Award: Bradley Lowery
Young Personality: Phil Foden
Unsung Hero Award: Denise Larrad

In Memoriam

Graham Taylor
Ugo Ehiogu
Germaine Mason Derek Ibbotson
Janette Brittin Megan Lowe
Sharon Laws
Peter Walwyn Mary Reveley Geoff Wragg
Tim Gudgin
Arthur Bunting Colin Hutton
David Parry-Jones Kevin Cadle Ralph Dellor
John Hampshire Peter Richardson Doug Insole
Rachael Heyhoe-Flint
Jana Novotna
Roger Becker Alan Little
Mike Smith Betty Cuthbert Philippa Roles
Cheick Tiote Freddy Shepherd
Elli Norkett John Gwilliam
Dermot Drummy Tommy Gemmell
Roger Self Dame Di Ellis
John Jacobs Roberto De Vicenzo
Jamie Hodson Gavin Lupton Mark Fincham
Jim Munkley Claire Robertson
Mick Adams Tom van Vollenhoven
Caroline Facer Jamie MacDonald
Colin Meads Dan Vickerman John Graham
Joost van der Westhuizen
Ronnie Moran Alex Young
Ryan McBride Izzy Dezu Billy Simpson
Michele Scarponi Mike Hall Stephen Wooldridge
Tommy Carberry John Buckingham Brian Fletcher
Errol Christie Jake LaMotta Terry Downes
Daniel Hegarty Nicky Hayden
John Surtees

References

External links
Official website

Bbc
BBC Sports Personality of the Year Award
BBC Sports Personality of the Year Award
Bbc
BBC Sports Personality of the Year awards
BBC Sports Personality of the Year Award